Henry de Boteler (fl. 1296), was an English politician.

He was a Member (MP) of the Parliament of England for Lancashire in 1296.

References

Year of birth missing
Year of death missing
English MPs 1296